Henco van Wyk (born 7 May 2001) is a South African rugby union player for the  in the Currie Cup. His regular position is outside centre. He was selected for the SA Schools Team in 2019. 

Van Wyk was named in the  squad for the 2021 Currie Cup Premier Division.

Henco van Wyk was named the Junior Springbok Player of the Year as he was a star for the national U20 side during their international series in 2021. He made his debut for the Lions in the United Rugby Championship against the Bulls in September 2022.

References

Alumni of Monument High School
South African rugby union players
Living people
Rugby union centres
Golden Lions players
Lions (United Rugby Championship) players
2001 births
Rugby union players from North West (South African province)